Ukraine at the European Road Championships is an overview of the Ukrainian results at the European Road Championships.

List of medalists

Medal table

Medals by year

Medals by discipline
updated after the 2014 European Road Championships

References
Results at the European Cycling Union website
Older results at:
Results men's RR U-23 (cyclingarchives)
Results men's ITT U-23 (cyclingarchives)
Results women's RR U-23 (cyclingarchives)
Results women's ITT U-23 (cyclingarchives)
Results men's RR Juniors (cyclingarchives)
Results men's ITT Juniors (cyclingarchives)
Results women's RR Juniors (cyclingarchives)
Results women's ITT Juniors (cyclingarchives)

See also

Other countries at the European Road Championships
 France at the European Road Championships
 Italy at the European Road Championships
 Netherlands at the European Road Championships
 Sweden at the European Road Championships

Nations at the European Road Championships
Ukraine at cycling events